A by-election for the Australian House of Representatives seat of Wide Bay was triggered by the death, on 31 July 1928, of Nationalist MP Edward Corser. However, by the close of nominations on 3 September only one candidate had nominated: Corser's son Bernard, who had the endorsement of the Nationalists' coalition partner the Country Party. Corser was thus declared elected unopposed. This is the only by-election at which a change of party status has not been contested.

Results

References

1928 elections in Australia
Queensland federal by-elections
1920s in Queensland
Unopposed by-elections